North Whizz Dome is a granite dome in the Tuolumne Meadows area of Yosemite National Park. North Whizz Dome is a bit south, of Cathedral Creek, which has its source, near Cathedral Peak. North Whizz Dome Dome is north of both Medlicott Dome and Pywiack Dome, both of which are south of California State Route 120, which runs through Tuolumne Meadows to Tioga Pass. It is near Hammer Dome, also, Daff Dome and Polly Dome are nearby.

On North Whizz Dome's particulars

North Whizz Dome is close to South Whizz Dome, and the two are often spoken of together. The Whizz Domes are actually two domes, next to each other: North and South Whizz domes, which are between Polly Dome and Daff Dome on Tioga Road (120).

North Whizz Dome has a few rock climbing routes.

References

External links and references

 A rock climbing map of North Whizz Dome
 Summit Post post
 On one rock climbing route, on North Whizz Dome

Granite domes of Yosemite National Park